Abel Guerra Garza (born 30 July 1954 in Reynosa, Tamaulipas) is a Mexican politician affiliated with the Institutional Revolutionary Party (PRI) who has served twice as municipal president of Escobedo, Nuevo León (1992-1994 and 1997-2000), and once as a federal congressman in the lower house of the Mexican Congress (2000–2002).

Guerra holds a bachelor's degree in Architecture and a master's degree in business administration (MBA) from the Autonomous University of Nuevo León (UANL).

In 2003 he was elected local deputy to serve in the Congress of Nuevo León but left that position to serve in the cabinet of Governor José Natividad González Parás.

He was the PRI presidential candidate to the Monterrey municipality during the 2006 local elections held on July 2, but lost against the PAN candidate Adalberto Madero.

In 2009 he tried to be PRI candidate to the 2009 Nuevo León gubernatorial election but instead he was designated the PRI candidate to the Monterrey municipal presidency election.

References

External links
( Abel Guerra at Legislative Information System

Members of the Chamber of Deputies (Mexico)
Members of the Congress of Nuevo León
Institutional Revolutionary Party politicians
Municipal presidents in Nuevo León
People from Reynosa
1954 births
Living people
21st-century Mexican politicians
Autonomous University of Nuevo León alumni
Academic staff of the Autonomous University of Nuevo León
20th-century Mexican politicians